Gino Anthony Pesi (born November 3, 1980) is an American actor, producer, and writer. He is best known for his role as James Nava in the NBC series Shades of Blue.

Early life 

Pesi was born on November 3, 1980 in Pittsburgh, Pennsylvania at Magee-Women's Hospital. He grew up as an only child in the Monongahela Valley with an affinity for sports and entertainment. He attended Geibel Catholic Junior-Senior High School in Connellsville before transferring to Charleroi High School, where he graduated in 1999. He graduated from Point Park University, Conservatory of Performing Arts as a theater major with a concentration in acting.

In 2013, Pesi was diagnosed with acromegaly while filming 42. Alfredo Quiñones-Hinojosa removed his tumor, and Pesi credits "Dr. Q" with allowing "me the opportunity to better my health." Pesi refers to this experience as "the greatest gift I've had," with a better appreciation of his life.

Filmography

Television

Videos

References 

http://devilworks.eu/projects/the-fare
https://www.imdb.com/title/tt7293920

External links 

 
 

20th-century American male actors
21st-century American male actors
American people of Italian descent
1980 births
American male film actors
American male television actors
Living people
Male actors from Pennsylvania